Close may refer to:

Music
 Close (Kim Wilde album), 1988
 Close (Marvin Sapp album), 2017
 Close (Sean Bonniwell album), 1969
 "Close" (Sub Focus song), 2014
 "Close" (Nick Jonas song), 2016
"Close" (Rae Sremmurd song), 2018
 "Close" (Jade Eagleson song), 2020
 "Close (to the Edit)", a 1984 song by Art of Noise
 "Close", song by Aaron Lines from Living Out Loud
 "Close", song by Drumsound & Bassline Smith from Wall of Sound
 "Close", song by Rascal Flatts from Unstoppable
 "Close", song by Soul Asylum from Candy from a Stranger
 "Close", song by Westlife from Coast to Coast
 "Close", song by French electronic group Telepopmusik and English vocalist Deborah Anderson, from their album Angel Milk

Other uses
 Close (surname)
 Cathedral close, the area surrounding a cathedral, typically occupied by buildings associated with it
 Close (2019 film), an action thriller
 Close (2022 film), a Belgian drama film
 Close, an alley or cul-de-sac
 Close, old English term for an estate
 Close, a common stair or entryway in a Scottish tenement
 Close (system call), a system call in computer software

See also
 Clos (disambiguation)
 Closed (disambiguation)
 Closing (disambiguation)
 Klos (disambiguation)
 Klose, a surname